The year 1746 in architecture involved some significant events.

Buildings and structures

Buildings

 Mansion of Ledreborg on Zealand, designed by Johan Cornelius Krieger, completed.
 Asamkirche, Munich, designed by Egid Quirin Asam and Cosmas Damian Asam, completed.
 Old Trinity Cathedral, Saint Petersburg, Russia, completed.
 St Lawrence's Church, Mereworth, England, consecrated.
 Transfiguration Church, Szentendre, Hungary, completed.
 Rebuilding of main chapel of the Cathedral of Évora, Portugal, designed by João Frederico Ludovice, completed.
 Second phase of construction of Poppelsdorf Palace near Bonn completed.
 Foundation stone of new Inveraray Castle in Scotland laid.

Births
 August 3 – James Wyatt, English architect (died 1813)

Deaths
 May 15 – John James, English architect (born c. 1673)
 June 8 – Giacomo Leoni, Venetian-born architect (born 1686)

References 

Architecture
Years in architecture
18th-century architecture